The Cobble is a mountain located in the Catskill Mountains of New York west-southwest of Delhi. Lumbert Hill is located north of The Cobble.

References

Mountains of Delaware County, New York
Mountains of New York (state)